Yn is an archaic Cyrillic letter. It looks like the Cyrillic letter Psi (Ѱ ѱ) with its upper half turned upside down but the letter mostly looks like an arrow pointing vertically up (↑).

Computing codes

 As few fonts contain the appropriate glyphs, the Upwards Arrow (↑) is sometimes substituted. The notable fonts that have included this glyph are FreeSerif and Segoe UI (since Windows 8).

See also
Cyrillic characters in Unicode

References

Cyrillic letters